Zarrinabad (also Romanized as Zarrīnābād; also known as Zarīnehābād) is a village in Qaslan Rural District, Serishabad District, Qorveh County, Kurdistan Province, Iran. At the 2006 census, its population was 97, in 28 families. The village is populated by Kurds with an Azerbaijani minority.

References 

Towns and villages in Qorveh County
Kurdish settlements in Kurdistan Province
Azerbaijani settlements in Kurdistan Province